Inertinite is oxidized organic material or fossilized charcoal. It is found as tiny flakes within sedimentary rocks. The presence of inertinite is significant in the geological record, as it signifies that wildfires occurred at the time that the host sediment was deposited. It is also an indication of oxidation due to atmospheric exposure or fungal decomposition during deposition. Inertinite is a common maceral in most types of coal. The main inertinite submacerals are fusinite, semifusinite, micrinite, macrinite and funginite. The most common type of inertinite maceral is semifusinite.

The optical properties of semifusinite are very similar to those of vitrinite. They differ in that semifusinite displays a folded texture as compared to vitrinite which generally maintains its composed structure. Inertinites also displays higher reflectance than vitrinite, except when approaching an anthracitic or graphite state.

References

Sedimentary rocks